Robert Parks may refer to:

W. Robert Parks (1915–2003), American academic, President of Iowa State University
Bobby Parks (cricketer) (born 1959), English cricketer
Robert J. Parks (1922–2011), US aerospace engineer and manager at the Jet Propulsion Laboratory

See also
Robert Park (disambiguation)